Linda Kenney Baden is an American lawyer, former prosecutor and private defense attorney.

Career 
Kenney Baden graduated from Rutgers Law School. She has participated in a number of high-profile cases including the trials of Phil Spector, Jayson Williams, Casey Anthony, Michael Skakel and Aaron Hernandez.

Media 
She is an on-air host for the Law & Crime Network and contributor to the Huffington Post.

She was portrayed by Helen Mirren in the 2013 HBO made-for-TV film Phil Spector, detailing her defense of Spector in his first trial for the murder of Lana Clarkson.

She is married to Michael Baden, a forensic pathologist, and together they authored Remains Silent: A Novel and Skeleton Justice.

References 

20th-century births
21st-century American women lawyers
21st-century American lawyers
Living people
Place of birth missing (living people)
Year of birth missing (living people)